John H. Jones (February 18, 1836 – March 19, 1875) was an American lawyer and politician.

Born in Center Lisle, Broome County, New York, he studied law in Coudersport, Pennsylvania and was admitted to the Pennsylvania bar. In 1857, he moved to Sheboygan, Wisconsin where he practiced law. Jones also served as District Attorney of Sheboygan County, Wisconsin 1862–1870. He then served in the Wisconsin State Senate as a Republican 1871–1872. He died in Sheboygan, Wisconsin.

Notes

1836 births
1875 deaths
People from Broome County, New York
People from Potter County, Pennsylvania
Politicians from Sheboygan, Wisconsin
Pennsylvania lawyers
Wisconsin lawyers
Republican Party Wisconsin state senators
19th-century American politicians
19th-century American lawyers